Aleksandr Belyakov (born 26 June 1962) was a Soviet luger who competed in the mid-1980s. Competing in two Winter Olympics, he won the silver medal in the men's doubles event at Sarajevo in 1984.

Belyakov also won a bronze in the mixed team event at the 1989 FIL World Luge Championships in Winterberg, West Germany. At the FIL European Luge Championships, he won two medals in the men's doubles event with a gold in 1986 and a bronze in 1988.

Belyakov won the overall Luge World Cup men's doubles title in 1987-8.

References

1988 luge men's doubles results

1962 births
Living people
Lugers at the 1984 Winter Olympics
Lugers at the 1988 Winter Olympics
Russian male lugers
Soviet male lugers
Olympic lugers of the Soviet Union
Olympic medalists in luge
Medalists at the 1984 Winter Olympics
Olympic silver medalists for the Soviet Union